Fordney is a surname. Notable people with the surname include:

Joseph W. Fordney (1853–1932), American politician
Diane Fordney (born 1940), American physician

Fictional characters:
Professor Fordney, character in Minute Mysteries, a syndicated column by Austin Ripley

See also
Fordney–McCumber Tariff, named after Joseph W. Fordney